Hongkou Football Stadium is a football stadium in Shanghai, China. Located in Hongkou District, the stadium has a maximum capacity of 33,060. It is the first ever football stadium to be built in China. The stadium was re-built in 1999, over the previous 46-year-old Hongkou Stadium, a general use sports stadium now replaced by the Shanghai Stadium. It is adjacent to Lu Xun Park.

History
The stadium has 3 squash courts inside and a climbing wall, which was rebuilt in early 2009. The stadium is currently used mostly for football matches and it is the home stadium of local football team Shanghai Shenhua F.C. It also hosted the final of the 2007 FIFA Women's World Cup. The stadium also was the home of Shanghai Guotai Jun'an Yongbo Women's F.C., a local women's football team, in 2016 season.

In 2013 Hongkou Football Stadium was the host of the National Electronic Sports Tournament (NEST).

Concerts
Mariah Carey：November 12 & 14, 2003 – Charmbracelet World Tour
Whitney Houston：July 22, 2004
Backstreet Boys: September 26, 2004
Linkin Park: November 18, 2007 – Minutes to Midnight World Tour, audience: 25,000
TVXQ: May 31, 2008 — O: The 2nd Asia Tour
Audiences : 40000
Kylie Minogue: November 29, 2008 – KylieX2008
Mariah Carey: October 19, 2014 – The Elusive Chanteuse Show
Linkin Park: July 22, 2015 – The Hunting Party Tour
Mayday: December 2–8, 2017 - Life Tour
Joker Xue: October 6–7, 2018 – Skyscraper World Tour

References

External links

Daum pictures
 Official Site
Atmosphere at Hongkou Stadium
Stadium picture

Football venues in Shanghai
2007 FIFA Women's World Cup stadiums
Sports venues in Shanghai
Hongkou District
Sports venues completed in 1999
1999 establishments in China